T Keller may refer to:

Thomas Keller (born 1955), American chef
Timothy J. Keller (born 1950), pastor of Redeemer Presbyterian Church in New York City